Icelandic singer-songwriter Björk has released 60 music videos (including 2 as a featured artist), 6 concert tour videos, 6 music video compilations, 3 television performances video albums, 4 documentary videos and 2 video albums box sets. She also appeared in 4 feature films as an actress and has made several television appearances and cameos, in addition to providing music and score to multiple movies. In 1992, Björk left her previous band, The Sugarcubes, and started her solo career with the release of her album Debut. Her first music video taken from the album was "Human Behaviour", directed by French director Michel Gondry, with whom she started a career-spanning collaboration. The video, followed by "Big Time Sensuality", "Army of Me", "It's Oh So Quiet", the latter two from her second studio album Post (1995), received heavy airplay on MTV channels and popularised her image. Starting with the videos taken from Homogenic (1997), as stated in a retrospective review from Philip Sherburne, her videos became "crucial" to build the world of her albums. She also started to experiment with CGI elements, as shown by videos like "Jóga" or "Hunter". "All Is Full of Love", directed by Chris Cunningham, received general acclaim from critics, went on to win two MTV Video Music Awards and was included in MoMA permanent collection.

In 1999, the singer was approached by Danish director Lars von Trier to star in his movie Dancer in the Dark (2000). It was Björk's second feature film lead appearance, having previously starred in the Icelandic television movie, Glerbrot (1987), and Nietzchka Keene's The Juniper Tree (1990). For her performance in Dancer in the Dark, Björk received critical acclaim, was nominated for two Golden Globe Awards and one Academy Award, and won the Best Actress Award at the 2000 Cannes Film Festival. For her 2001 album Vespertine, Björk wanted to convey a more minimalistic and intimate image in her videos, resulting in videos like "Pagan Poetry" and "Cocoon", which were banned from prime-time MTV airplay. In 2003, Björk started a collaboration with collective LynnFox, which provided several visual that served as backdrops for her Greatest Hits Tour and also the video for "Oceania", which was projected during her 2004 Summer Olympics opening ceremony performance. In 2005, Björk starred as the female lead actress in Matthew Barney's Drawing Restraint 9, for which she also composed the soundtrack. Björk's music video for "Wanderlust", directed by Encyclopedia Pictura, received attention for being one of the first 3D music video.

Björk's 2011 multimedia project Biophilia, included her seventh studio album, a world tour, an app and a series of educational workshops. To document the album's creation and themes, Björk collaborated with British Natural historian David Attenborough, and filmed the documentary When Björk Met Attenborough, narrated by Tilda Swinton. The tour's final show at Alexandra Palace in London was premiered as a concert film during 2014 Tribeca Film Festival. Coinciding with the release of Vulnicura (2015), Björk was honored by the MoMa with an artist retrospective, for which she was commissioned a music video for her song "Black Lake". Subsequently, the singer started to experiment with virtual reality videos, resulting in work like "Stonemilker", "Notget" and "Quicksand", which was premiered as the first YouTube virtual reality live stream. All these videos were part of the Björk Digital exhibition, which premiered at Carriageworks, Sydney in 2016, and were later included in the Vulnicura VR album, which was firstly released on Steam in September 2019. Björk's recent videos continue to be received favorably, with her 2017 video for "The Gate" being named the best music video of 2017 by Pitchfork.

Music videos

1990s

2000s

2010s

2020s

Video albums

Concert films

Music videos compilations

Television performances

Documentaries

Box sets

Filmography

Feature films

Television

Other appearances

Soundtrack appearances

See also
 Björk discography
 List of songs recorded by Björk

References

External links

Filmographies
Actress filmographies
Videographies